The 1930 Massachusetts gubernatorial election was held on November 4, 1930.

Incumbent Republican Governor Frank G. Allen was defeated by Democrat Joseph B. Ely. This election marked the beginning of a new era for the Massachusetts Democratic Party, starting a string of eight consecutive years of Democratic governors, a streak later surpassed from 1974 until 1986.

Republican primary

Governor

Candidates

Declared
Frank G. Allen, incumbent Governor
John D. Devir, mayor of Malden

Results

Democratic primary

Governor

Candidates

Declared
 John J. Cummings, former State Senator and nominee for Lieutenant Governor in 1924
 Joseph B. Ely, candidate for Governor in 1922
 John "Honey Fitz" Fitzgerald, former United States Representative, Mayor of Boston, and nominee for Governor in 1922

Results
The Democratic primary featured a rematch of the 1922 primary between Joseph Ely and John Fitzgerald.This time, Ely won with 54.7% of the vote.

Fitzgerald was forced to withdraw late in the race due to illness, though his name remained on the ballot, and James Michael Curley encouraged a vote for Fitzgerald against the "anti-Irish" Ely.

General election

Results

See also
 1929–1930 Massachusetts legislature

References

Governor
1930
Massachusetts
November 1930 events